Kampinos Forest is a large forest complex located in Masovian Voivodeship, west of Warsaw in Poland.

It covers a part of the ancient valley of the Vistula basin, between the Vistula and the Bzura rivers.

Once a forest covering 670 km2 of central Poland, it currently covers roughly 240 km2.

Kampinos National Park
Most of the Kampinos forest is currently protected within Kampinos National Park (Kampinoski Park Narodowy).

Among the distinctive features of the area is a combination of sandy dunes and marshes, with dense pine and spruce forest.

The forest is a Natura 2000 EU Special Protection Area.

See also

Special Protection Areas in Poland

External links

Forests of Poland
Geography of Masovian Voivodeship
Parks in Masovian Voivodeship
Natura 2000 in Poland
Central European mixed forests